Ben Ferguson (born January 21, 1995) is an American snowboarder from Bend, Oregon.

Career
He won the silver medal at the Winter X Games XX and the bronze medal at the Winter X Games XXII.  In 2018, he was named to the U.S. Olympic Snowboarding Team for the 2018 Winter Olympics.

Ben spends most of his summers in Mt. Hood, Oregon teaching young snowboarders during his signature sessions at High Cascade Snowboard Camp. He is sponsored by 10 Barrel Brewing, Burton Snowboards, Redbull, Mt. Bachelor, Anon Optics, and Crabgrab.

Snowboarding career 

Men's Halfpipe Competitions

2014 X Games Aspen - 5th
2015 X Games Aspen - 12th
2016 X Games Aspen - 2nd
2016 Burton U.S. Open - 2nd
2017 U.S. Grand Prix Copper Mountain - 2nd
2017 X Games Aspen - 7th
2017 Dew Tour - 3rd
2018 X Games Aspen - 3rd
2018 Burton U.S. Open - 4th
2018 U.S. Grand Prix Aspen - 2nd
2018 PyeongChang Winter Olympics - 4th 
2019 X Games Aspen - 6th

Other Career Highlights

2012 Innsbruck Youth Olympics - 1st Halfpipe, 2nd Slopestyle
2013 Legendary Banked Slalom Mount Baker
2015 Red Bull Double Pipe - 1st place double's contest
Three-time winner of Danny Davis' Peace Park

References

External links
 
 
 
 
 

1995 births
American male snowboarders
Living people
Place of birth missing (living people)
Snowboarders at the 2012 Winter Youth Olympics
X Games athletes
Snowboarders at the 2018 Winter Olympics
Olympic snowboarders of the United States
Youth Olympic gold medalists for the United States
Youth Olympic silver medalists for the United States
21st-century American people